Niccolò Gucci (born 3 June 1990) is an Italian professional footballer who plays as a forward for Arezzo.

Career
Born in Bagno a Ripoli, Gucci started his career in Serie D and Lega Pro Seconda Divisione clubs.

For the 2012–13 Serie D season, he joined to Pistoiese. Gucci played 31 matches and scored 16 goals.

On 1 November 2013, he moved to Correggese.

On 15 July 2014, he signed with Serie D side Fano. Gucci played three years for Fano, winning the promotion on his second year. He made his Serie C debut on 27 August 2016 against Südtirol.

On 11 July 2017, he joined to Serie D club Pro Patria. He played two seasons in the club, winning the promotion on his first year.

On 10 July 2019, he returned to Pistoiese, this time on Serie C.

On 7 January 2021, he moved to Vis Pesaro.

On 18 November 2022, Gucci joined Serie D club Arezzo.

References

External links
 
 

1990 births
Living people
People from Bagno a Ripoli
Sportspeople from the Metropolitan City of Florence
Footballers from Tuscany
Italian footballers
Association football forwards
Serie C players
Lega Pro Seconda Divisione players
Serie D players
Scandicci Calcio players
A.C. Perugia Calcio players
U.S. Pistoiese 1921 players
U.S. Poggibonsi players
S.S.D. Correggese Calcio 1948 players
Alma Juventus Fano 1906 players
S.S.D. Varese Calcio players
Aurora Pro Patria 1919 players
Vis Pesaro dal 1898 players
S.S. Arezzo players